West Jasper Place may refer to:
Jasper Place, a former town in Alberta, Canada, now part of the city of Edmonton, known as West Jasper Place from 1910 to 1950
West Jasper Place, Edmonton, a neighbourhood within Jasper Place
West Jasper Place, Edmonton (area), an area that includes 17 neighbourhoods, immediately west of Jasper Place